The Anning River is a river in the Hengduan Mountains region of southwestern Sichuan, China.  The river is tributary of the Yalong River, itself a tributary of the Jinsha River which is the head stream of the Yangtze.  The river is located primarily in Liangshan Prefecture except for the mouth of the river which enters the Yalong in Panzhihua Prefecture.

Geography

Course of the River 
The Anning River has its source is the southern Xiaoxiang Range in Mianning County, Liangshan.  From here, it flows in a southerly direction between the southern Daxue Mountains and the Xiaoxiang through the Anning River Plain and meets its largest left tributary, the Sunshui River, at Luguzhen.  Measured to the furthest source, the Sunshui forms the main stem of the Anning.  Continuing south, the Anning River Plain widens and provides for greater human activity.  The capital of Liangshan, Xichang, is located at the widest extent of the valley to the east of the river.

The Anning exits the Anning River Plain in Dechang County and flows south-southwesterly until it meets the Yalong River in Yanbian County, Panzhihua.

Anning River Plain 

Unlike other larger river valleys in the region, including those of the deeply-incised Yalong and Jinsha Rivers, the Anning River has a relatively flat valley known as the Anning River Plain. The plain, and in fact the entire Anning River's course, follows the tectonically active Anninghe Fault where a southeastern portion of the Tibetan Plateau abuts the Yangtze Plate.

History
There is evidence of human activity in the Anning River basin since the Neolithic Age.  Burial tombs from this era have been uncovered.  In the last 3,000 years, the Anning River basin developed as the heartland for the Yi People who migrated from the Tibetan Plateau and supplanted or assimilated with the original inhabitants.  In the 2nd century BCE, the Anning River basin was incorporated into Han Dynasty China as it provided a crucial direct route between the Sichuan Basin and the annexed Dian Kingdom in present-day Yunnan.  Qiongdu (now known as Xichang) was the primary settlement in the region and was a territorial garrison of the Han.  The Anning River valley drifted in and out of Chinese administration through subsequent dynasties until its control by the Chinese was solidified in the Ming Dynasty.

In addition to being a major source of agriculture for the region, the Anning River and its valley has served as a major transportation corridor in southwest China, particularly between the major cities of Kunming and Chengdu.  The Chengdu–Kunming railway, completed in 1970, and the G5 Expressway, completed in 2018, both follow the course of the Anning River.

Several dams have been constructed along the Anning River's length including the Chengnan Dam, Qianjinqu Dam, and Xiaosanxia Dam.

References

Rivers of Sichuan